Ramanujganj is one of the 90 Legislative Assembly constituencies of Chhattisgarh state in India. It is in Balrampur district and is reserved for candidates belonging to the Scheduled Tribes.

Members of Legislative Assembly

Election results

2018

See also
List of constituencies of the Chhattisgarh Legislative Assembly
Balrampur district, Chhattisgarh
Ramanujganj

References

Assembly constituencies of Chhattisgarh
Balrampur district, Chhattisgarh